Calosphaeriophora is a monotypic genus of fungi in the family Calosphaeriaceae. It contains the sole species Calosphaeriophora pulchella

References

External links 
 

Monotypic Sordariomycetes genera
Calosphaeriales